Matthew McLeod "Matt" Taylor (born 23 April 1970 in Atlanta) is an American slalom canoeist who competed from the mid-1990s to the mid-2000s. Competing in two Summer Olympics, he earned his best finish of eighth in the C-2 event in Athens in 2004.

During his career in C2 he was partnered by several different paddlers including Lecky Haller (1997-2000) and Joe Jacobi (2002-2004)

World Cup individual podiums

References

Sports-Reference.com profile

1970 births
American male canoeists
Canoeists at the 2000 Summer Olympics
Canoeists at the 2004 Summer Olympics
Living people
Olympic canoeists of the United States